The Roman historian Suetonius (c. AD 69 – c. AD 122) mentions early Christians and may refer to Jesus Christ in his work Lives of the Twelve Caesars. 
One passage in the biography of the Emperor Claudius Divus Claudius 25, refers to agitations in the Roman Jewish community and the expulsion of Jews from Rome by Claudius during his reign (AD 41 to AD 54), which may be the expulsion mentioned in the Acts of the Apostles (18:2). In this context "Chresto" is mentioned. Some scholars see this as a likely reference to Jesus, while others see it as referring to an otherwise unknown person living in Rome.

Christians are explicitly mentioned in Suetonius' biography of the Emperor Nero (Nero 16) as among those punished during Nero's reign. These punishments are generally dated to around AD 64, the year of the Great Fire of Rome. In this passage Suetonius describes Christianity as excessive religiosity (superstitio) as do his contemporaries, Tacitus and Pliny.

Historians debate whether or not the Roman government distinguished between Christians and Jews prior to Nerva's modification of the Fiscus Judaicus in AD 96. From then on, practising Jews paid the tax, Christians did not.

Christians under Nero
Roman Emperor Nero reigned 54 to 68 AD. In Nero 16, Suetonius lists various laws by Nero to maintain public order, including halting chariot races, as the drivers were cheating and robbing, and pantomime shows which frequently were scenes of brawls. Amongst these is punishment for Christians. He states:

The punishment of Christians by Nero are generally dated to  64 AD. Unlike Tacitus' reference to the persecution of Christians by Nero, Suetonius does not relate the persecution with the Great Fire of Rome that occurred in 64 AD.

Apart from the manuscripts and printed editions of Suetonius' Lives, the sentence about Christians is first attested in an inscription by the Senate and People of Paris from 1590. K.R. Bradley notes that the verb in the clause "Punishment was inflicted on the Christians" (Latin: afflicti suppliciis christiani) should be corrected to "affecti", based first on the frequent use of this verb with the word for "punishment" and second on that Orosius, according to Bradley, uses this verb in material dependent on the Suetonius Nero 16 passage. These words in combination indicate that the punishment was capital; cf. e.g. Suet. Augustus 17.5 (death of young Antony), Claudius 26.2 (death of Messalina) and Galba 12.1 (death of officials).

Tertullian 
Church father Tertullian wrote: "We read the lives of the Cæsars: At Rome Nero was the first who stained with blood the rising faith" Mary Ellen Snodgrass notes that Tertullian in this passage "used Suetonius as a source by quoting Lives of the Caesars as proof that Nero was the first Roman emperor to murder Christians", but cites not a specific passage in Suetonius' Lives as Tertullian's source. Other authors explicitly add that Tertullian's words are a reference to the passage in Suetonius' Nero 16, while others hold that they refer to the Tacitus passage, or both (Nero & Tacitus) passages.

Interpretation 
In Roman usage, the word superstitio refers to any excessive religious devotion, within or outside traditional Roman religious practice. To Suetonius this particular excessive devotion was new and mischievous. This may have been the case in Suetonius' time, but Marius Heemstra thinks he was backdating the accusation to the time of Nero.

The word translated as "mischievous" above is maleficus which can also mean "magical". As a noun the word means "magician". It may be that Suetonius is here accusing Christians of using what would be called "black magic" in modern terms, as the pagan philosopher Celsus did about 177.
 
The passage shows the clear contempt of Suetonius for Christians - the same contempt expressed by Tacitus and Pliny the younger in their writings. Stephen Benko states that the contempt of Suetonius is quite clear, as he reduces Christians to the lowest ranks of society and his statement echoes the sentiments of Pliny and Tacitus.

Possible Christians under Claudius
Roman Emperor Claudius reigned 41 to 54 AD. Suetonius reports his dealings with the eastern Roman Empire, that is, with Greece and Macedonia, and with the Lycians, Rhodians, and Trojans.

In Claudius 25 Suetonius refers to the expulsion of Jews by Claudius and states (in Catharine Edwards' translation):

As it is highly unlikely that a hypothetical Christian interpolator would have called Jesus "Chrestus", placed him in Rome in 49, or called him a "troublemaker", the overwhelming majority of scholars conclude that the passage is genuine.

The Latin text
The Latin original version of this statement is as follows (in Ihm's edition):

The brief Latin statement has been described as a "notorious crux" and William L. Lane explains that the Latin text is ambiguous, giving two ways of interpreting it:

 "He expelled from Rome the Jews constantly making disturbances at the instigation of Chrestus"
 "Since the Jews constantly make disturbances at the instigation of Chrestus, he expelled them from Rome."

The first indicates that Claudius only expelled those Jews who were making disturbances. Boman (2012) uses the following translation, which he "consider[s] non-committal and adequately close to the original Latin": "From Rome he (Claudius) expelled the perpetually tumultuating Jews prompted by Chrestus."

The spelling issue
Chresto (ablative of Chrestus) is the most trustworthy spelling in Suetonius' work.  William L. Lane states that the confusion between Chrestus and Christus was natural enough for Suetonius, given that at that point in history the distinction between spelling and pronunciation was negligible. Lane states that this is supported by the spelling of Christians in Acts 11:26, Acts 26:28 and in 1 Peter 4:16 where the uncial codex Sinaiticus reads Chrestianos. Raymond E. Brown states in the second century, when Suetonius wrote, both Christus (Christ) and Christianus (Christian) were often written with an "e" instead of an "i" after the "r".  In Suetonius Nero 16 the word "Christians" is spelled christiani.

Interpretation 
James D.G. Dunn states that most scholars infer that "Suetonius misheard the name 'Christus' (referring to Jesus as Christ) as 'Chrestus'" and also misunderstood the report and assumed that the followers of someone called Chrestus were causing disturbances within the Jewish community based on his instigation.  R.T. France says that the notion of a misspelling by Suetonius "can never be more than a guess, and the fact that Suetonius can elsewhere speak of 'Christians' as members of a new cult (without any reference to Jews) surely makes it rather unlikely that he could make such a mistake." The term Chrestus (which may have also been used by Tacitus) was common at the time, particularly for slaves, meaning good or useful. However, Cook points out that this name was only a common name among pagans. While 126 individuals named Chrestus are known from Rome alone, 59 of whom were slaves, there is only a single documented Jew named Chrestus and even this Jew practiced paganism. Therefore, Cook finds it unlikely that the Jewish agitator Chrestus could be someone other than Christ.

Louis Feldman states that most scholars assume that in the reference Jesus is meant and that the disturbances mentioned were due to the spread of Christianity in Rome. Robert E. Van Voorst states that Suetonius had a misleading source of information leading him to believe that Christ was actually present as an agitator during the reign of Claudius. Later, Van Voorst explains that in the passage Chrestus is most likely an error for Christus. E. M. Smallwood states that the only reasonable interpretation is that Suetonius was referring to Christianity.  Edwin M. Yamauchi states that "A growing number of scholars, however, have accepted the argument that the "Chrestus" mentioned in Suetonius was simply a Jewish agitator with a common name, and that he had no association with Christianity." 
Among recent classical scholars there does not seem to be the certainty that is found among many biblical studies scholars. Barbara Levick comments, "To claim that Suetonius, writing in the second century, misunderstood a reference to Christians in his source is unconvincingly economical", concluding "The precise cause of the expulsion remains obscure." J. Mottershead in his commentary on the Claudius states that if Suetonius "had included a reference to Christ one would not have expected him to have simply used Chrestus/Christus unqualified." This points "towards the conclusion that Suetonius did not have in mind a religious dispute involving Christians."

Menahem Stern said that Suetonius was definitely referring to Jesus Christ; because he would have added "a certain" to Chrestus if he had meant an unknown agitator.

Disturbance and expulsion

Most scholars assume that the disturbances mentioned by Suetonius in the passage were due to the spread of Christianity in Rome. These disturbances were likely caused by the objections of Jewish community to the continued preachings by Hellenistic Jews in Rome and their insistence that Jesus was the Messiah, resulting in tensions with the Jews in Rome.

Some scholars think Suetonius was confused and assumed that Chrestus, as the leader of the agitators, was alive and lived in Rome at the time of the expulsion. The notion that Chrestus was instigating Jewish unrest suggests that the Chrestus reference is not a Christian interpolation, for a Christian scribe would be unlikely to think of the followers of Christ as Jews, or place him in Rome at the time of Claudius. This problem weakens the historical value of the reference as a whole. Scholars are divided on the value of the Suetonius reference; some see it as a reference to Jesus, others see it as a reference to disturbances by an unknown agitator.{{refn|group=note|The same view has been espoused by Neil Elliot (impulsore Chresto probably refers to "Chrestus" having prompted Claudius' expulsion, not the Jews' disturbances') and Ian Rock ("there is sufficient reason to believe that either Chrestus may have been the impulsor to Claudius given the evidence that powerful freedmen influenced Claudius' decisions").}}Brian Incigneri, The Gospel to the Romans (Leiden: Brill, 2003)  p.211.

Dating the expulsion provides some challenges because Suetonius writes in a topical rather than chronological fashion, necessitating the use of other texts to establish a time frame. The dating of the "edict of Claudius" for the expulsion of Jews relies on three separate texts beyond Suetonius' own reference, which in chronological order are: the reference to the trial of Apostle Paul by Gallio in the Acts of the Apostles (18:2), Cassius Dio's reference in History 60.6.6-7 and Paulus Orosius's fifth century mention in History 7.6.15-16 of a non-extant Josephus. Scholars generally agree that these references refer to the same event. Most scholars agree that the expulsion of some Jews mentioned by Suetonius happened around AD 49–50, but a minority of scholars suggest dates within a few years of that range.Christianity and the Roman Empire: background texts by Ralph Martin Novak 2001  pages 18-22

Other Roman sources

Suetonius is one of three key Roman authors who may refer to early Christians, the other two being Pliny the Younger and Tacitus.Robert E. Van Voorst Jesus Outside the New Testament: An Introduction to the Ancient Evidence Eerdmans Publishing, 2000.  page 69-70 These authors refer to events which take place during the reign of various Roman emperors, Suetonius writing about the Claudius expulsion and Nero's persecutions, Tacitus referring to Nero's actions around the time of the Great Fire of Rome in 64 AD, while Pliny's letters are to Trajan about the trials he was holding for Christians around 111 AD.P.E. Easterling, E. J. Kenney (general editors), The Cambridge History of Latin Literature, page 892 (Cambridge University Press, 1982, reprinted 1996).  But the temporal order for the documents begins with Pliny writing around 111 AD, then Tacitus around 115/116 AD and then Suetonius around 122 AD.Christianity and the Roman Empire: background texts by Ralph Martin Novak 2001  pages 13 and 20

See also

Historicity of Jesus
Historical Jesus
Josephus on Jesus
Lucian on Jesus
Mara Bar-Serapion

Notes

References

Bibliography
Barry Baldwin, Suetonius: Biographer of the Caesars. Amsterdam: A. M. Hakkert, 1983 .
H. Dixon Slingerland, 'Suetonius "Claudius" 25.4 and the Account in Cassius Dio', JQR 79, 4 (1988) pp. 305–322. (Cassius Dio) 
H. Dixon Slingerland, 'Suetonius Claudius 25.4, Acts 18, and Paulus Orosius' "Historiarum Adversum Paganos Libri VII:" Dating the Claudian Expulsion(s) of Roman Jews', JQR 83, 1/2 (1992) pp. 127–144. (Orosius) 
H. Dixon Slingerland, 'Acts 18:1-18, the Gallio Inscription, and Absolute Pauline Chronology', JBL 110, 3 (1991) pp. 439–449. (Gallio) 
Robert E. Van Voorst, Jesus outside the New Testament: an introduction to the ancient evidence'', Wm. B. Eerdmans Publishing, (2000) (Jesus''') 

Persecution of early Christians
Historiography of Jesus
Ancient Roman literature about early Christianity